Gagatli is a village in Botlikh district in Dagestan, Russia

Geographical location 
It is located 14 km northeast of the village Botlikh.

Language 
The villagers speak the Andi language. In 1981, a linguistic expedition was undertaken by the Department of Structural and Applied Linguistics of the Faculty of Philology MSU led by A. E. Kibrika.

References 

 Photo of the village

Geography of Dagestan